Army Men: Air Tactics is a real-time tactics video game developed and published by The 3DO Company exclusively for Microsoft Windows. Air Tactics is a helicopter game using the Army Men 2 engine.

Overview
The player character is Captain William Blade of the Green Airborne Cavalry. The game is a top-down flight sim that places the player in a number of different helicopters. Captain Blade's main responsibility is to act as aerial support for Sarge Hawk and his men. The game introduces abilities such as lifting heavy objects and transporting them to other locations, landing on the ground to load/unload soldiers and unique airborne combat not seen in other games. In addition, the game contains a number of mini games such as playing air-hockey versus a Tan helicopter, as well as a number of static games.

Reception

The game received mixed reviews according to the review aggregation website GameRankings.

References

External links

2000 video games
Army Men
Helicopter video games
Real-time tactics video games
Single-player video games
Video games developed in the United States
Windows games
Windows-only games